was a district located in Hiroshima Prefecture, Japan.

Towns and villages
At the time of discontinuation of the district, there were two towns and no villages in the district.
 Miyajima
 Ōno

Mergers
 On March 1, 2003 - the town of Saeki, and the village of Yoshiwa were merged into the expanded city of Hatsukaichi.
 On November 1, 2004 - the towns of Nōmi, Ōgaki and Okimi, along with the former town of Etajima (from Aki District), were merged to create the city of Etajima.
 On April 25, 2005 - the town of Yuki was merged into Saeki-ku, Hiroshima.
 On November 3, 2005 - the towns of Miyajima and Ōno were merged into the expanded city of Hatsukaichi. Therefore, Saeki District was dissolved as a result of this merger.

Former districts of Hiroshima Prefecture